Atan may refer to:

Places
 Atan, Armenia
 Atan, Iran

People
 Atan Shansonga (born 1955), Zambian diplomat
 Çağdaş Atan, Turkish footballer
 Cem Atan, Turkish footballer

Other
 Attan, a Pashtun and Afghan traditional dance
 arctangent, a trigonometric function
 atan2, the two-argument function implementing the arctangent in many computer languages

Turkish-language surnames